Carl Gustav Boberg (16 August 1859 – 7 January 1940, aged 80) was a Swedish poet and elected official, best known for writing the Swedish language poem "O Store Gud" (O Great God) from which the English language hymn "How Great Thou Art" is derived.

Biographical details
Born in Mönsterås, Kalmar County in Småland, Boberg was a carpenter's son, worked briefly as a sailor, and served as a lay minister in the Mission Covenant Church of Sweden. He was the editor of a weekly Christian newspaper, Sanningsvittnet  (Witness of the Truth), from 1890 until 1916. Boberg served in the Riksdag for 20 years from 1912 to 1931. He published more than 60 poems, hymns, and gospel songs, including a collaboration with Swedish hymnist Lina Sandell.

References

External links

1859 births
1940 deaths
Christian hymnwriters
Litteris et Artibus recipients
Members of the Riksdag
People from Mönsterås Municipality
Swedish male writers
Swedish poets
Swedish Protestant hymnwriters
Swedish songwriters